"Light of a Clear Blue Morning" is a song written and recorded by American entertainer Dolly Parton. The song first appeared on her 1977 New Harvest...First Gathering album, and provided a top twenty country music hit for her as a single. As Parton has told interviewers over the years, the song came out of the pain from her break with longtime musical and business partner Porter Wagoner. Parton left Wagoner's band in 1974, in an effort to aim her career in a more mainstream pop direction; Wagoner responded by taking legal action, and the next couple of years were reportedly painful for both performers. According to the unauthorized 1978 biography, Dolly, by Alanna Nash, "Light of a Clear Blue Morning" was written as Parton felt the figurative clouds lifting, as the fruits of her sacrifices of the previous few years were becoming apparent.

Parton has recorded "Light of a Clear Blue Morning" three times. It was released as a single in March 1977 from the album New Harvest...First Gathering. The song just missed the top ten on the U.S. country charts, peaking at number 11. Parton rerecorded the song to include in her 1992 film Straight Talk; for this recording, she changed the lyrics of verse two. A third recording of the song appeared on an album of patriotic and religious songs Parton released in 2003 titled, For God and Country.

Critical reception
Mark Deming of Allmusic declared that, "'Light of a Clear Blue Morning', is a sophisticated piece of adult contemporary songcraft".

Chart performance

Covers and other appearances
Glen Campbell covered the song on his 1991 album Unconditional Love. 

American professional choir, Conspirare, covered it in 2009 live and for their album "A Company of Voices: Conspirare in Concert." The group's director, Craig Hella Johnson, created the arrangement for a cappella choir with Tin whistle. The arrangement has been published and has since been performed by many choirs around the world. The arrangement omits verse 2. 

The Wailin' Jennys covered the song on their 2017 album Fifteen.

Miley Cyrus covered the song on the May 8, 2021 episode of Saturday Night Live as a Mother's Day tribute. Cyrus honored her godmother, Parton, during the tribute along with her own and the cast member's mothers.

Morgan James covered the song in the May 14, 2021 airing of a PBS Special called We Are Family: Songs of Hope and Unity.

Waxahatchee included the song in an extended version of her 2020 album Saint Cloud, released to celebrate the album's one year anniversary with three cover songs added to the original track list.

References

Further reading
 Nash Alanna, 1978. Dolly. Cooper Square Press, New York.

External links

Light Of A Clear Blue Morning lyrics at Dolly Parton On-Line

1977 singles
1977 songs
1992 singles
Columbia Records singles
Dolly Parton songs
Glen Campbell songs
RCA Records singles
Songs written by Dolly Parton